The Último Dragón  Gym Championship was the top title in the Japanese professional wrestling promotion Toryumon. As it was a professional wrestling championship, the championship was not won not by actual competition, but by a scripted ending to a match determined by the bookers and match makers. On occasion the promotion declares a championship vacant, which means there is no champion at that point in time. This can either be due to a storyline, or real life issues such as a champion suffering an injury being unable to defend the championship, or leaving the company.

Title history

Footnotes

References

External links
Wrestling-Titles.com
The Complete History of the Ultimo Dragon Gym Championship

Heavyweight wrestling championships
Toryumon championships